Vorotishna is a rural locality (a village) in Tolshmenskoye Rural Settlement, Totemsky District, Vologda Oblast, Russia. The population was 23 as of 2002.

Geography 
Vorotishna is located 84 km southwest of Totma (the district's administrative centre) by road. Shulgino is the nearest rural locality.

References 

Rural localities in Tarnogsky District